The Last Judgement Triptych is a triptych by Georgios Klontzas. Klontzas was a Greek painter and prominent member of the Cretan School. He is likened to El Greco and Michael Damaskinos. His artistic period was between 1550 and 1608. He had a workshop in Heraklion, Crete. He created many forms of art such as triptychs, portable icons or paintings, and manuscripts. Klontzas created several versions of the Last Judgment or Second Coming. His The Last Judgment also features the same theme but is a painting, not a triptych. Klontzas also created other triptychs.

The final and infinite judgment by God is believed to be the Second Coming. People of every nation will be judged resulting in the approval of some and the penalizing of others. This triptych is a pictorial representation of that event. Greek and Italian Byzantine artists used the theme in countless works of art. Italian artist Fra Angelico created many triptychs of The Last Judgement. Klontzas may have been exposed to Italian prototypes. Both the triptych and The Last Judgement are in the collection of the Hellenic Institute of Venice in Italy.

Description
The triptych was gilded with gold, the painting material was egg tempera and gold leaf on three separate wood panels. The width is 79 cm (31.1 in) and the height is 67 cm (26.4 in). The gilded metallic portion was made with elaborate decorations. The upper portion features scenes from Genesis in fifteen small circles. In the central upper archway right below the scenes of Genesis Jesus appears, the Virgin Mary is to his right and John the Baptist appears to his left resembling The Last Judgment painting of Klontzas. The trio is surrounded by flying heads. 

Below the holy trio, Adam and Eve hold the cross as they gaze upon hell. To the right of the cross, Noah carries the ark over his head, to the left of the cross Moses is holding a tablet. On the same side as Noah, Abraham and Isaac are present. Isaac carries the wood of sacrifice on his back. He is escorted by two lions. Below the group, a band plays and the book of life is opened. Two archangels appear in the lower vertical center of the image. The Archangel Michael holds a scale depicting the weighing of souls. The Archangel Gabriel behind him holds the sword. Winged demons are also present. The demon characters resemble his other works namely The Last Judgment.

On panel 1 to the viewer's left in the upper archway six apostles are seated in heavenly thrones. Throughout the three panels, naked figures are mixed with nobility and clergy. Klontzas makes a clear distinction between the chosen and damned. Below the apostles in panel 1,  Constantine and  Helena stand by the True Cross. Saint Catherine stands by the wheel. The remaining figures participate in the dance of the last judgment. The hierarchs, military saints, monks, and holy women are present. At the bottom of the panel, a scene depicts the resurrection of the dead. 

On the third panel to the viewer's right, the upper archway features the remaining six apostles. Below the apostles, clergy, and nobles. A huge scene depicting hell occupies over half of the panel. Klontzas created a magnificent version of hell. Abraham, Lazarus and Isaac sit on top of the smoking renaissance building which is crowded with demons. A figure reminiscent of Greek mythology resembling Charon appears. Charon was the ferryman of Hades who carried the souls of the dead. The ferry boat carries the damned to the mouth of hell.

Gallery

References 

17th-century paintings
Paintings in Venice
Cretan Renaissance paintings